Anne W. Simon (1914 – July 29, 1996) was an American writer and environmentalist.

Biography
She was born Anne Rebe Wertheim, in Cos Cob, Connecticut, the daughter of Alma (née Morgenthau) and banker Maurice Wertheim. Her grandfather was ambassador Henry Morgenthau Sr. Her sisters were Josephine Wertheim Pomerance (mother of architect Rafe Pomerance) and Barbara W. Tuchman (mother of Jessica Mathews). In 1935, she graduated with a B.A. from Smith College and then earned a M.A. in Social Work from Columbia University. 

She began her career as a writer WNYC, a radio station in New York and later worked as a television critic for The Nation.  She then wrote for various publications including McCall's and Good Housekeeping. In 1964, she wrote Stepchild in the Family: A View of Children in Remarriage based on her experiences as a stepchild and as a stepparent. In 1973, No Island Is an Island: The Ordeal of Martha's Vineyard about sprawl, traffic jams, and pollution at Martha's Vineyard. In 1978, she wrote The Thin Edge: Coast and Man in Crisis about the poor condition of dunes and beaches. In 1984, she wrote, Neptune's Revenge: The Ocean of Tomorrow, was a critique of overfishing, oil spills, radioactive waste, and toxins.

Books
Stepchild in the Family: A View of Children in Remarriage (1964)
No Island Is an Island: The Ordeal of Martha's Vineyard (1973)
The Thin Edge: Coast and Man in Crisis (1978)
Neptune's Revenge: The Ocean of Tomorrow (1984)

Personal life
She married thrice. Her first husband was Dr. Louis Langman who she married in 1937; the marriage ended in divorce. Her second husband was real estate developer Robert E. Simon; the marriage ended in divorce. Her third husband was Walter Werner. She had four children from her first marriage: Thomas Langman; Betsy Langman Schulberg (married and divorced from Budd Schulberg), Lynn Langman Lilienthal (married Philip H. Lilienthal in 1963), and Deborah Langman Lesser.

She died on July 29, 1996, she died at her home in Manhattan.

References

1914 births
1996 deaths
Businesspeople from New York City
American people of Jewish descent
American environmentalists
Smith College alumni
People from Cos Cob, Connecticut
Morgenthau family
Wertheim family
Columbia University alumni